Asma Arbab Alamgir (born 9 July 1965) is a Pakistani politician who served as member of the National Assembly of Pakistan.

Early life and education
Alamgir was born on 9 July 1965. She completed her graduation in Law and Economics.

She is wife of Arbab Alamgir Khan.

Political career
Alamgir was elected to the National Assembly of Pakistan as a candidate of Pakistan Peoples Party on a seat reserved for women from Khyber Pakhtunkhwa in the 2008 Pakistani general election.

In February 2010, she was made president of the women wing of Pakistan Peoples Party while she was working as provincial coordinator of PPP in Khyber Pakhtunkhwa. In April 2010, she was appointed as Advisor to the Federal Minister of States and Frontier Regions.

References

Pakistani MNAs 2008–2013
1965 births
Living people
Arbab Khan family